Townley is an unincorporated community in Walker County, Alabama, United States. It was formerly an incorporated town from 1895 until the 1920s. Townley has one site on the National Register of Historic Places, Boshell's Mill.

Demographics

Townley, a coal-mining town, was initially incorporated in 1895. It appeared on the next three consecutive U.S. Censuses, reaching its zenith in 1920, when it became the 4th largest town in Walker County, with 1,554 residents. At some point after 1920 the coal mine shut down and the town either disincorporated or lost its charter, and has not appeared on census rolls since.

Geography
Its geographical location is in Walker County, Alabama, United States, North America

Notable people
 Tom Bevill, Democratic fifteen-term U.S. congressman who represented Alabama's 4th Congressional District and Alabama's 7th congressional district from 1967 to 1997
 Carter Manasco, U.S. Representative from 1941 to 1949

References

Unincorporated communities in Alabama
Unincorporated communities in Walker County, Alabama